George B. Kittinger (July 4, 1865 – March 30, 1933) was an American politician in the state of Washington. He served in the Washington House of Representatives from 1895 to 1899.

References

1865 births
1933 deaths
Republican Party members of the Washington House of Representatives